Bentley Park is a suburb of Cairns within the local government area of Cairns Region, Queensland, Australia.

History
Bentley Park is situated in the Yidinji traditional Aboriginal country. 
The origin of the suburb name is from a property titled Bentley Hall in England, named by an early settler Isaac Abraham Hartill.   

The Edmonton Catholic School was established on 29 April 1929 by the Sisters of Mercy with an initial enrolment of 30 pupils. In 1965 it was renamed St Therese’s School. As suburban development increased around Edmonton, the rising number of students made it necessary to relocate the school to neighbouring Bentley Park in 1995. Although now under lay leadership, the school continues to be operated in the Mercy tradition.

Bentley Park State School was originally opened in 1997. In 2004, the construction of high school facilities made it a P-12 school called Bentley Park College.

At the 2011 census, Bentley Park had a population of 7,420.

Schools 
 Bentley Park College
 Saint Therese's School

Amenities 
St Therese's Catholic Church is at 135 Robert Road. It is within the Edmonton Parish of the Roman Catholic Diocese of Cairns.

References

External links
 University of Queensland: Queensland Places: Bentley Park
Bentley Park College school web site

Suburbs of Cairns